Richard Morrissette (born April 28, 1956) is an American politician who served in the Oklahoma House of Representatives from the 92nd district from 2004 to 2016.

References

1956 births
Living people
People from Rochester, New Hampshire
Democratic Party members of the Oklahoma House of Representatives